The Singulato iS6 is a mid-size all-electric luxury crossover utility vehicle made by Singulato, a brand from a Chinese start-up based in Beijing called Zhiche Auto. Small batch production started in late 2017 with mass production planned, to start in mid 2018, with prices planned to be from 200,000 to 300,000 yuan ($30,000 – 43,000).

Overview

The Singulato iS6 was introduced during the Shanghai Auto Show by Singulato, with the production version of the iS6 electric SUV debuting on the 2018 Beijing Auto Show.

Singulato claims that the Singulato iS6 has a range of 400 kilometers, and is capable of accelerationg from 0 to 100 km/hr in four seconds. The battery pack consists of 18650 lithium ion batteries which is enough for 320 kilometers of range after a one hour charge on a fast-charger. The is6 has two electric motors with a combined output of 348 hp and 580 Nm.

The production Singulato iS6 is semi-autonomous or Level 2 autonomous with various driver-assistance systems such as adaptive cruise control, lane-departure warning, and automatic parking. A Level 3 autonomous version will be launched late 2018, while the fully autonomous version will be launched in 2020. Starting from 2017, buyers can reserve their Singulato iS6. Singulato will offer a five-seat and a seven-seat versions of the iS6.

References

External links 

 
 Singulato Brand site

Electric concept cars
Production electric cars
Mid-size sport utility vehicles
Crossover sport utility vehicles
Cars introduced in 2017
2010s cars
Automobiles with gull-wing doors